Mike Lee (born 1971) is an American politician serving as U.S. senator from Utah since 2011.

Michael Lee or Mike Lee may also refer to:

Performing arts
Michael Lee (musician) (1969–2008), English rock drummer
Michael K. Lee (born 1973), American theater actor
Mike Lee (musician) (born 1988), American Christian musician, worship pastor, and guitarist

Politics
Michael Lee (Australian politician) (born 1957), Australian Labor politician
Michael Lee (Canadian politician), BC Liberal Party MLA
Michael V. Lee (born 1968), North Carolina state senator
Mike Lee (New Zealand politician), Auckland councilor

Sports
Michael Lee (basketball, born 1983), American basketball player and assistant coach
Michael Lee (basketball, born 1986), American basketball player
Michael Lee (field hockey) (born 1980), Canadian field hockey player
Michael Lee (speedway rider) (born 1958), speedway world champion
Michael Lee (Zimbabwean cricketer) (1935–2012), Zimbabwean cricketer
Mike Lee (American football) (born 1991), American football cornerback
Mike Lee (baseball) (born 1941), former baseball player
Mike Lee (boxer) (born 1987), American boxer
Mike Lee (bull rider) (born 1983), American bull rider
Mike Lee (ice hockey, born 1990), American ice hockey goaltender
Mike Lee (ice hockey, born 1996), American ice hockey defenseman
Mike Lee (tennis) (born 1963), American tennis player
Arthur Lee (cricketer, born 1913) (Arthur Michael Lee, 1913–1983), English cricketer and lawyer, known as Michael Lee in his legal career

Other uses
Michael Lee (judge) (born 1965), Australian judge
Michael Lee (The Wire), fictitious character on The Wire, played by Tristan Wilds
Mike Lee Stakes, a New York state horse race

See also
Michael Leigh (disambiguation)